Terren Jones (born November 19, 1991) is an American football offensive tackle who is currently a free agent. He played college football at Alabama State University and attended Choctawhatchee High School in Fort Walton Beach, Florida. He has been a member of the Atlanta Falcons, Washington Redskins, Baltimore Ravens, Tennessee Titans, Buffalo Bills, and Tampa Bay Buccaneers of the National Football League.

College career
Jones played for the Alabama State Hornets from 2009 to 2012. He was named 2010 Second-team All-SWAC, 2011 First-team All-SWAC, College Sporting News Division I Black College All-American, Boxtorow Honorable Mention All-American, 2012 First-team All-SWAC, and 2012 AFCA All-American.

Professional career

Atlanta Falcons
Jones signed with the Atlanta Falcons in April 2013 after going undrafted in the 2013 NFL Draft. He was released by the Falcons on September 3 and signed to the team's practice squad on September 5, 2013. He was promoted to the active roster on November 28, 2013. He was released by the Falcons on August 30, 2014 and signed to the team's practice squad on August 31, 2014. He was released by the Falcons on September 23, 2014.

Washington Redskins
Jones was signed to the Washington Redskins' practice squad on September 29, 2014. He was released by the Redskins on November 4, 2014.

Baltimore Ravens
Jones was signed to the Baltimore Ravens' practice squad on November 10, 2014.

Tennessee Titans
Jones was signed off the Baltimore Ravens' practice squad by the Tennessee Titans on December 2, 2014. He made his NFL debut on December 7, 2014 against the New York Giants. He was released by the Titans on July 31, 2015.

Buffalo Bills
Jones signed with the Buffalo Bills on August 1, 2015. He was released by the Bills on August 31, 2015.

Tampa Bay Buccaneers
Jones was signed to the Tampa Bay Buccaneers' practice squad on September 6, 2015. He was released by the Buccaneers on September 8, 2015.

References

External links
NFL Draft Scout

Living people
1991 births
Players of American football from Maryland
Players of American football from Florida
American football offensive tackles
African-American players of American football
Alabama State Hornets football players
Tennessee Titans players
People from Fort Meade, Maryland
People from Fort Walton Beach, Florida
21st-century African-American sportspeople
Atlanta Falcons players